Microbulbifer celer is a Gram-negative, rod-shaped and non-motile bacterium from the genus of Microbulbifer which has been isolated from a marine solar saltern from the Yellow Sea in Korea.

References

External links
Type strain of Microbulbifer celer at BacDive -  the Bacterial Diversity Metadatabase

Alteromonadales
Bacteria described in 2007